002 operazione Luna is a 1965 science fiction comedy film directed by Lucio Fulci. The film stars Franco and Ciccio, Mónica Randall and Linda Sini. The film's Spanish print released in 1968 was titled Dos cosmonautas a la fuerza and ran only 76 minutes.

Plot
KGB authorities abduct two criminals (Franco and Ciccio) who look precisely like missing spacemen and pretend they are the returning cosmonauts. They launch them in a rocket so that they can land in public view, leading the populace to believe it was the original spacecraft that had returned. The two criminals look so much like the astronauts that they even fool the astronauts' wives. Later, however, the actual spacecraft returns to Earth undamaged, and the plan goes all to pieces. In the end, Franco and Ciccio stay in Russia, and the real astronauts relocate to Italy.

Cast
Franco Franchi as Franco / Colonel Paradowsky 
Ciccio Ingrassia as Ciccio / Major Borovin 
Mónica Randall as Mishca Paradowsky 
Linda Sini as Leonidova 
María Silva   
 (credited as Hélène Sedlak) 
Emilio Rodríguez   
 Francesca Romana Coluzzi as Russian Agent
Chiro Bermejo
Ignazio Leone as Sergio 
Franco Morici 
Enzo Andronico as Ivan 
 as soviet lieutenant
Lino Banfi as Policeman (credited as Pasquale Zangaria)

Production
Director Lucio Fulci stated that both 002 operazione luna and The Two Parachutists had more restrictions put on him than usual. Fulci explained that both films were shot in seven weeks. Despite the 002 in the title, the film is not a spy spoof and there are few scenes set in outer space. Along with Warriors of the Year 2072, this film was among the two films that had Fulci attempt a science fiction themed production.

Fulci has proclaimed that to film the scene where a space ship takes off in the film, he used four lights and a black cloth over a stage with a lot of little bulks on the floor for stars, all filmed in slow motion. Fulci referred to this special effect as "a source of pride for me!". Troy Howarth, a Fulci biographer, commented that Fulci's memory must have been faulty, since he claims that scene in the film was all done using stock footage.

Release
002 operazione luna was distributed in Italy on November 25, 1965 and in Spain on August 4, 1968.

Footnotes

References

External links 
 

1960s buddy comedy films
Spanish science fiction comedy films
1960s science fiction comedy films
Films about astronauts
Films directed by Lucio Fulci
Films set in Russia
1960s Italian-language films
Italian black-and-white films
Italian buddy comedy films
Italian science fiction comedy films
1960s Italian films